Feagin is a surname. Notable people with the surname include:

Arthur Feagin (1878–1932), American football player
Joe Feagin (born 1938), American sociologist and social theorist 
Susan L. Feagin (born 1948), American philosopher
Wiley Feagin (1937–1990), American football player